Thomas Edward Dooley (15 December 1914 – 1975) was an English professional footballer. A right half, he played for his hometown club, Accrington Stanley. He was also on the books of Blackpool, but did not feature for the first team, and  Rochdale.

References

1914 births
1975 deaths
People from Accrington
English footballers
Bacup Borough F.C. players
Blackpool F.C. players
Accrington Stanley F.C. players
Rochdale A.F.C. players
Association football midfielders